Zoltán Varga may refer to:

Zoltán Varga (chess player) (born 1970), Hungarian chess grandmaster
Zoltán Varga (footballer, born 1945) (1945–2010), Hungarian footballer
Zoltán Varga (footballer, born 1977), Hungarian footballer
Zoltán Varga (footballer, born 1983), Hungarian footballer
Zoltán Varga (politician) (born 1952), Hungarian Minister of Local Government
Zoltán Varga (rally driver) (born 1964), Hungarian rally driver
Zoltán Szilágyi Varga (born 1951), Hungarian graphic artist and animation director

See also 
 Zoltán